Tancrède is a 1702 tragédie en musique (a French opera in the lyric tragedy tradition) in a prologue and five acts by composer André Campra and librettist Antoine Danchet, based on Gerusalemme liberata by Torquato Tasso.

The opera contains 23 dances in addition to the singing. It is famous for having the alleged first contralto role in French opera. (However, in modern terms it is considered more of a mezzo-soprano range.) The role was written for Julie d'Aubigny, known as 'La Maupin', the most colorful singer of this era. It's also notable for the unusual choice of three low-lying voices for the main male parts.

Performance history

Tancrède was first performed on 7 November 1702 by the Académie Royale de Musique at the Théâtre du Palais-Royal in Paris under the direction of Marin Marais. It was successful and remained in the repertoire until the 1760s.

Roles

References
Notes

Sources
Original printed score: Tancrede , tragedie, mise en musique par Monsieur Campra. Représentée pour la premiere fois par l'Academie royale de musique le septiéme jour de novembre 1702, Paris, Ballard, 1702 (accessible for free online at Gallica - B.N.F.)
Anthony, James R (1992), 'Tancrède' in The New Grove Dictionary of Opera, ed. Stanley Sadie (London) 

Le magazine de l'opéra baroque, page: Tancrède

External links

University of Texas page

Tragédies en musique
Operas by André Campra
French-language operas
Operas
Opera world premieres at the Paris Opera
Operas based on works by Torquato Tasso
1702 operas